Maria del Mar may refer to:

Maria del Mar (singer), Canadian rock singer, and occasional actress
Maria del Mar (actress) (born 1964), Canadian television and film actress